Tormore School was a private boarding and day school for girls in North Adelaide, South Australia.

History
Tormore House had its origins in a small school for girls set up by Elizabeth McMinn (c. 1840 – 26 December 1937) and her two sisters Sarah Hamill "Sally" McMinn (died 15 May 1922 in Ealing) and Martha McMinn, on Molesworth Street, North Adelaide in 1876. This may have been their family home, in which their father Joseph died two years earlier. In February 1884 the McMinn sisters moved their school to another property on nearby Buxton Street, which they dubbed "Tormore" for their birthplace in Ireland.

Residents of Tormore, Ireland included one Mary Rutherdale (c. 1764 – 3 January 1849) - from Parish Headstones Donaghmore, Down, Ireland"Here lie the remains of Robert McMinn, of Tormore, who departed this life the 12th October, 1808, aged 70 years. Also the remains of his brother Gilbert McMinn of Tormore, who departed this life on the 12th of April, 1823, aged 77 years. Also the remains of their niece Mary Rutherdale, of Tormore, who departed this life on the 3rd of January, 1849, Aged 84 years. Robert McMinn, of Castle Ennigan, died 15th December, 1879, Aged 80 years."

It had been John Whinham's North Adelaide Grammar School, which he relinquished to move to larger premises at the corner of Ward and Jeffcott Streets.
The school was taken over by Ann and Caroline Jacob towards the end of 1897, and the McMinn sisters left Adelaide on 15 December, retiring to Ealing Common, England. The school moved to new premises at 211 Childers Street in January 1899, with a house for boarders alongside.

In 1907 Caroline Jacob took over the Unley Park Grammar School and ran the two institutions concurrently. Around this time substantial improvements were made: separate facilities for the younger (8–12 y.o.) students and additional premises for boarders, art studies and a kindergarten. Caroline Jacob's father financed the construction of a gymnasium, which also served as a large meeting-hall.

School enrolments declined alarmingly during World War I; negotiations with (Anglican) Bishop Nutter Thomas for incorporation into the Church education system came to nothing, and in 1918 the school moved to smaller premises in Barton Tce. and the Childers Street premises became the "Andover" residential flats; the School closed in 1920. "Andover" later became the site of the Kindergarten Teachers College, then the Kingston College of Advanced Education in 1974. The subdivided area is now known as Tormore Place.

A Tormore Old Scholars' Association was active from at least 1906 to 1954, and a reunion held in 1936 exclusively of the McMinn sisters' students, attracted over 60 old scholars.

Notable students
Esther Gwendolyn "Stella" Bowen (1893–1947) one of three women appointed official war artists WWII (the others being Sybil Craig and Nora Heysen)
Phyllis Dorothy Cilento née McGlew (1894–1987)
Francisca Adriana "Paquita" Delprat, daughter of G. D. Delprat and wife of Douglas Mawson
Heather Gell (1896–1988) leading exponent of Dalcroze Eurhythmics
Gladys Reynell (1881–1956)

Teaching staff
Ellen Ida Benham, BSc. (1871 – 1917) taught science until 1912, then bought Walford School (later Walford Church of England Girls' Grammar School) in Malvern
John Millard Dunn (1865–1936) organist and choirmaster for St. Peter's Cathedral, taught singing and music theory
Hilda Farsky BA (1880–1950) married Frederick William Eardley (1874–1958) in 1909
Rosa C(atherine) Fiveash (1854–1938) drawing teacher
Ida Doreen Hamilton (died 1969) drawing teacher
Helen Milvain Good ( –1941)
Mabel Phyllis Hardy (1890–1977) student at Tormore then taught at Unley Park campus, later proprietor and headmistress of Stawell School, Mount Lofty
S(ophia) E(llen) Holder BA (1882–1960) mayoress of Victor Harbor
Ann "Annie" Jacob (17 December 1853 – 11 January 1913), Caroline's sister
Arabella Aldersey Manning (1868–1949) married Charles Mather Leumane (c. 1845–1928) on 21 December 1907. She was drawing teacher, 1900 to 1907. He was an operatic tenor and singing teacher; James Riley was a notable student.
Mary A. Overbury ( –1926) prominent artist. Later had her own school at Hawthorn.
Hilda Dora Evelyn Tucker ( –1962) vice principal from c. 1915

References 

Educational institutions established in 1883
Defunct schools in South Australia
High schools in South Australia
Defunct girls' schools in Australia
Private schools in Adelaide
1883 establishments in Australia
1920 disestablishments in Australia
History of Adelaide